The Andhra Pradesh State Handloom Weavers Cooperative Society (Telugu : ఆంధ్రప్రదేశ్ రాష్ట్ర చేనేత పారిశ్రామికుల సహకారక సంఘం) popularly known as APCO (ఆప్కో), is a cooperative of traditional handloom weavers of the Indian state of Andhra Pradesh. This is under the control of Department of Handlooms and Textiles of Government of Andhra Pradesh. The organisation owns a number of shopping outlets in Andhra Pradesh. The society was registered in the year 1976 with registered No. T.P.W. 44 under the Andhra Pradesh Cooperative Societies Act.

See also
 Khadi
 Khādī Development and Village Industries Commission (Khadi Gramodyog)
 Co-optex
 Government of Andhra Pradesh

References

External links
 Official Andhra Pradesh State Handloom Weavers Cooperative Society webpage
 Department of Handlooms and Textiles of AP
 Facebook Page

Cooperatives in India
Handloom industry in India
State agencies of Andhra Pradesh
Design companies established in 1976
Organisations based in Vijayawada
1976 establishments in Andhra Pradesh